Kanubari is a Tehsil in the Indian state of Arunachal Pradesh. Longding is the name of the district that contains Kanubari sub divisions ADC independent

Kanubari is located  towards East from District headquarters Longding. It is one of the 58th  constituencies of Legislative Assembly of Arunachal Pradesh. Name of current MLA of this constituency is Gabriel D. Wangsu. He has won his 2nd term from BJP ticket against Nokchai Bohham of INC.

Culture

People
Kanubari is inhabited by  Wancho tribe. They celebrate Oriah as main festival of harvest.

See also
List of constituencies of Arunachal Pradesh Legislative Assembly
Arunachal Pradesh Legislative Assembly

References

Villages in Tirap district